Nicholas David Champion (born 27 February 1972) is an Australian politician. He is a member of the South Australian Labor Party and has served in the South Australian House of Assembly since the 2022 South Australian state election, representing the  seat of Taylor. He has served as the Minister for Trade and Investment, Minister for Housing and Urban Development and Minister for Planning in the  Malinauskas ministry since March 2022.

Champion previously served in federal parliament as a Labor Party member in the House of Representatives from 2007 to 2022, first representing the Division of Wakefield until its abolition in 2019, before transferring to the new Division of Spence.

Early life
Champion was born in Elizabeth in South Australia. He spent his early years in the rural town of Kapunda and completed his secondary education at Kapunda High School while working part-time as a fruit picker. He also previously worked as a cleaner, salesman and trolley collector. He completed an Arts degree and a Graduate Diploma in Communication at the University of South Australia.

Champion became a union official at the Shop, Distributive and Allied Employees Association (SDA) in 1994, serving as an organiser, training officer and occupational health and safety officer. He is aligned with the Labor Right.

Champion served as South Australian State President of the Australian Labor Party from 2005 to 2006 and was a ministerial adviser to state Labor Minister Michael Wright.

Federal parliament

Champion won the seat of Wakefield at the 2007 election, defeating incumbent Liberal Party of Australia member David Fawcett with a 56.6 percent two-party vote. He was the third Labor member to ever win the seat. Champion made it a safe Labor seat on paper at the 2010 election with a 62 percent two-party vote, and became the first Labor member to be re-elected to Wakefield. The South Australian federal redistribution in 2011 had the greatest impact on Wakefield where the Labor margin declined by 1.5 points. Champion retained Wakefield at the 2013 election on a 53.4 percent two-party vote even as Labor lost government, marking the first time the non-Labor parties won government at an election without winning Wakefield. Champion increased his margin at the 2016 election with a 61 percent two-party vote, again making Wakefield a safe Labor seat on paper.

Champion served as a shadow parliamentary secretary (shadow assistant minister from 2016) in Bill Shorten's shadow ministry from 2014 to 2019.

In August 2019, he called for the nationalisation of Port Darwin following its lease to a Chinese-owned company.

State parliament
In 2020, Champion was rumoured to be considering a switch to state parliament, initially through the electoral district of Light in the South Australian House of Assembly, following the release of draft new boundaries that would have left the seat vacant. That plan was thwarted by the final report of the Electoral Districts Boundaries Commission, however Champion was again the topic of speculation in January 2021, this time for the safe seat of Taylor. Both state electorates are covered by Champion's larger federal division of Spence.

On 13 February 2021, Champion was pre-selected for the House of Assembly seat of Taylor for the 2022 South Australian election. On 22 February 2022, he resigned his federal seat of Spence to contest the state election a month later. A by-election in his seat of Spence was not held due to the pending federal election. Taylor was a comfortably safe Labor seat, and Champion easily retained the seat. He was immediately promoted to Cabinet, serving as the Minister for Trade and Investment, Minister for Housing and Urban Development and Minister for Planning in the Malinauskas ministry.

Personal life
Champion is married to Fiona Webber, a former ABC journalist and Chief of Staff to a Federal Labor Minister. They were married in Gibraltar after he proposed in the week of the 2013 election. Their first child was born just over a month after the 2016 election.
Nick Champion lives outside of the electoral district of Taylor. He is a resident of North Adelaide.

References

External links

Summary of parliamentary voting for Nick Champion MP on TheyVoteForYou.org.au

Australian people of Cornish descent
Australian Labor Party members of the Parliament of Australia
Labor Right politicians
Living people
Members of the Australian House of Representatives
Members of the Australian House of Representatives for Wakefield
University of South Australia alumni
1972 births
Australian trade unionists
21st-century Australian politicians
Members of the Australian House of Representatives for Spence